The 1844 United States presidential election in Kentucky took place between November 1 and December 4, 1844, as part of the 1844 United States presidential election. Voters chose 12 representatives, or electors to the Electoral College, who voted for President and Vice President.

Kentucky voted for the Whig candidate, Henry Clay, over Democratic candidate James K. Polk. Clay won his home state by a margin of 8.18%.

With 54.09% of the popular vote, Clay's home state would be his third strongest victory after Rhode Island and Vermont.

Results

References

Kentucky
1844
1844 Kentucky elections